Michael, Mick, Mickey, Micky, or Mike Burns may refer to:

Entertainment industry figures
Michael Burns (actor) (born 1947), American performer during 1960s and 1970s; later historian and academic
Michael Burns (executive) (born 1958), American vice chairman of Lionsgate
Michael Justin Burns (born 1973), American independent filmmaker; professional name Burnie Burns
Mickey Burns, American interviewer on 2011 TV program Profiles
Mike Burns (actor) (born 1952), English performer in BBC sitcom The Brittas Empire
Mike Burns (broadcaster) (1937–2021), Irish broadcaster
Mike Burns (producer) (born 1972), American music producer

Characters
Mike Burns (Neighbours), late 1990s regular on Australian serial Neighbours

Politicians
Michael Burns (Tennessee politician) (1813–1896), Irish-born American banker and businessman
Michael W. Burns (born 1958), American legislator in Maryland House of Delegates
Mike Burns (politician) (born 1952), American legislator in South Carolina House of Representatives

Sportspeople

Football players
Michael Burns (footballer) (born 1988), English midfielder
Michael Burns (Gaelic footballer) (1961–2015), Irish Gaelic midfielder
Mick Burns (footballer) (1908–1982), English goalkeeper
Micky Burns (born 1946), English footballer
Mike Burns (American football) (born 1954), American defensive back
Mike Burns (soccer) (born 1970), American defender

Other sportsmen
Michael Burns (New Zealand cricketer) (born 1979), New Zealand cricketer
Mick Burns (hurler) (born 1937), Irish right wing-back
Mike Burns (baseball) (born 1978), American pitcher
Mike Burns (basketball) (born 1962), American college coach
Mike Burns (cricketer) (born 1969), English all-rounder and later umpire

See also
Michael Byrnes (disambiguation)
Michael Byrne (disambiguation)